Ulan-Majorat  is a village in Radzyń Podlaski County, Lublin Voivodeship, in eastern Poland. It is the seat of the gmina (administrative district) called Gmina Ulan-Majorat.

References

Villages in Radzyń Podlaski County